Songs with a theme of nuclear war have been a feature of popular culture since the early years of the Cold War.

List of songs about nuclear war
 "A Blue Wave" By Cleaners From Venus (1981)
 "Adrian" By Eurythmics (1985)
 "After the Fall" By Klaus Nomi (1982)
 "After the Holocaust" By Nuclear Assault (1986)
 "After the War" By Asia (1985)
 "Aftermath" By Armored Saint (1985)
 "Aftershock" By Anthrax (1985)
 "All Fall Down" By B-Movie (1991)
 "Always the Sun" By The Stranglers (1986)
 "America" By Kurtis Blow (1986)
 "American Soviets" By CCCP (1990)
 "April 2031" By Warrant (1992)
 "Armageddon Days (Are Here Again)" By The The (1989)
 "As The World Burns" By Bolt Thrower (1992)
 "As the World Caves In" By Matt Maltese (2017)
 "Atom Drum Bop" By The Three Johns (1986)
 "Atom Tan" By The Clash (1982)
 "Atomic" By Blondie (1980)
 "Atomic Dog" By George Clinton and the P-Funk All-Stars (1982)
 "Atomic Playboys" By Steve Stevens (1989)
 "Back to Zero" By The Rolling Stones (1986)
 "Beat Street" By Grandmaster Flash and the Furious Five (1984)
 "Beneath the Remains" By Sepultura (1989)
 "Between the Wheels" By Rush (1984)
 "Beyond the Black" By  Metal Church (1984)
 "Billy's Line" By Red Box (1986)
 "Birthright" By Anderson, Bruford, Wakeman, Howe (1989)
 "Black Celebration" By Depeche Mode (1986)
 "Black Planet" By The Sisters of Mercy (1985)
 "Blackened" By Metallica (1988)
 "Blossom and Blood" By Midnight Oil (1985)
 "Blow the House Down" By Siouxsie and the Banshees (1984)
 "Blowin' Sky High" By Berlin (1988)
 "Bombers" By David Bowie (1971)
 "Bomb Iran" By JC & The B-1 Bombers (1980)
 "The Bomb Song" By Darwin Deez
 "Bombe the Russians" By Fear (1985)
 "Boom Box" By Vitabeats (1985)
 "Breathing" By Kate Bush (1980)
 "Brighter Than A Thousand Suns" By Iron Maiden (2006)
 "Brush the Dust from That Old Bible" By Bradley Kincaid (1950)
 "Burning Down the House" By Talking Heads (1983)
 "Burning Heart" By Survivor (1985)
 "Can't Stop Running" By Space Monkey (2002)
 "Channel-Z" By The B-52's (1989)
 "Chemical Bomb" By Aquabats (1999)
 "Chemical Warfare" By Slayer (1983)
 "Christmas at Ground Zero" By "Weird Al" Yankovic (1986)
 "Claude Rains" By The Front Lawn (1989)
 "Clean, Clean" By Bruce Woolley and the Camera Club / The Buggles (1979)
 "Cloudburst at Shingle St." By Thomas Dolby (1982)
 "Come Away Melinda" By Bobbie Gentry (1968)
 "Countdown to Extinction" by Megadeth (1992)
 "Countdown to Zero" By Asia (1985)
 "Crawl Out Through the Fallout" By Sheldon Allman (1960)
 "Cries of Help" By Discharge (1982)
 "Cruise" By David Gilmour (1984)
 "Cruise Missiles" By Fischer-Z (1981)
 "Cuando Seas Grande" By Miguel Mateos (1993)
 "Curfew" By The Stranglers (1978)
 "Current Events" By Joe King Carrasco and the Crowns (1998)
 “Dancing at the Nuclear Holocaust” By Doug P. Stone (1977) 
 "Dancing With Tears in My Eyes" By Ultravox (1984)
 "Dangerous Moments" By Martin Briley (1985)
 "Dawn Patrol" By Megadeth (1990)
 "The Day After" By The Men They Couldn't Hang (1985)
 "The Dead Next Door" By Billy Idol (1983)
 "De Bom" By Doe Maar (1983)
 "De Bom Valt Nooit" By Herman van Veen (1984)
 "Def.Con.One" By Pop Will Eat Itself (1992)
 "D-Day" By Bus Boys (2001)
 "Dig a Hole in the Ground" By Fred Small (2011)
 "Disaster Area" By All Out Attack (2006)
 "Distant Early Warning" By Rush (1984)
 "Does Anybody Care" By Alex Hirsch (2022)

 "Domino" By Genesis (1986)
 "Don't Crash" By Front 242 (1987)
 "Do the Evolution" By Pearl Jam (1998)
 "Do You Believe in the Westworld?" By Theatre of Hate (1982)
 "Down from the Sky" By Trivium (2008)
 "Dream Home in New Zealand" By The Beat (1981)
 "Dream Told by Moto" By Minutemen (1983)
 "Earth Crusher" By Mr. Lif (2002)
 "Eighth Day" By Hazel O'Connor (1980)
 "Einstein A Go Go" By Landscape (1981)
 "Electric Funeral" By Black Sabbath (1970)
 "The End" By Discharge (1981)
 "Enola Gay" By OMD (1980)
 "Euroshima" By John Waite (1984)
 "Eve of Destruction" By Barry McGuire (1965)
 "Everybody Have Fun Tonight" By Wang Chung (1997)
 "Everybody Wants to Rule the World" By Tears for Fears (1985)
 "Everyday Is Like Sunday" By Morrissey (1988)
 "Fabulous Disaster" By Exodus (1989)
 "Fact And Fiction" By Twelfth Night (1982)
 "Fallout" By Data (1980)
 "Fallout Shelter" By Peter Scott Peters (1961)
 "Famous Last Words" By Tears for Fears (1989)
 "Fight Fire with Fire" By Metallica (1984)
 "The Final Bloodbath" By Discharge (1982)
 "The Final Countdown" By Europe (1986)
 "Final Day" By Young Marble Giants (1980)
 "Fire in the Sky" By Saxon (1981)
 "Fireside Favourite" By Fad Gadget (1980)
 "Five Years" By David Bowie (1972)
 "Flame of the West" By Big Country (1984)
 "Flyingdale Flyer" By Jethro Tull (1980)
 "Forever Young" By Alphaville (1984)
 "Four Minute Warning" By Mark Owen (2003)
 "Four Minutes" By Culture Shock (1989)
 "Four Minutes" By Roger Waters (1987)
 "Folded Flags" By Roger Waters (1987)
 "French Letters" By Herbs (1987)
 "The Future's So Bright, I Gotta Wear Shades" By Timbuk 3 (1986)
 "Games Without Frontiers" by Peter Gabriel (1980)
 "Glad It's All Over" By Captain Sensible (1994)
 “Grandpa Atomic” By New Bomb Turks (1994)
 "The Great Atomic Power" By The Louvin Brothers (1962)
 "Ground B Sound" By Death Piggy (1999)
 "Ground Zero Brooklyn" By Carnivore (band) (1987)
 "The Gunner's Dream- Paranoid Eyes" By Pink Floyd (1983)
 "Guns in the Sky" By INXS (1987)
 "Hallowed Ground" By Violent Femmes (1984)
 "Hammer to Fall" By Queen (1984)
 "A Hard Rain's a-Gonna Fall" By Bob Dylan (1963)
 "Harrisburg" By Midnight Oil (1985)
 "Heat" By Leslie Spit Treeo (1990)
 "Heatwave" By Fay Ray (1982)
 "A Hell On Earth" By Discharge (1982)
 "He Looks Like Spencer Tracy Now" By Deacon Blue (1987)
 "Help Save the Youth of America" By Billy Bragg (1986)
 "Hercules" By Midnight Oil (1992)
 "Here Comes President Kill Again" By XTC (1989)
 "Heresy" By Rush (1991)

"History (remember Hiroshima & Nagasaki)" By John McGuinness (1984) John McGuinness & Vince Lewis band (2018)
 "Hiroshima" By Gary Moore (1983)
 "Hiroshima" By Sandra (1990)
 "Hiroshima Nagasaki Russian Roulette" By Jim Page (1976)
 "Hiroshima Nagasaki Russian Roulette" By Moving Hearts (1981)
 "Hiroshima, Mon Amour" By Ultravox (1977)
 "House at Pooneil Corners" By Jefferson Airplane (1968)
 "Human Error" By Subhumans (1981)
 "I.C.B.M." By Amebix (1987)
 "I Come and Stand at Every Door" By The Byrds (1966)
 "I Don't Wanna Die" By 4 Skins (1982)
 "I Found That Essence Rare" By Gang of Four (1979)
 "Ignorance" By Sacred Reich (1987)
 "I Melt with You" By Modern English (1982)
 "In the Hole" By Armored Saint (1985)
 "Invasion" By Skrewdriver (1984)
 "I Remember the Sun" By XTC (1984)
 "Is There Something I Should Know?" By Duran Duran (1981)
 "It's a Mistake" By Men At Work (1983)
 "I've Known No War" By The Who (1982)
 "I Won't Let the Sun Go Down on Me" By Nik Kershaw (1984)
 "Janitor" By Suburban Lawns (1980)
 "Just Another Day" By Oingo Boingo (1985)
 "Jesus Hits Like the Atomic Bomb" By Lowell Blanchard and the Vally Trio (1998)
 "Kill for Peace" By The Fugs (1966)
 "Kill the Poor" By Dead Kennedys (1978)
 "Killer of Giants" By Ozzy Osbourne (1986)
 "Kinky Sex Makes the World Go Round" By Dead Kennedys (1982)
 "King of the World" By Steely Dan (1973)
 "Land of Confusion" By Genesis (1986)
 "Last Domino" By Genesis (1986)
 "Last in the House of Flames" By UK Decay (1981)
 "Lawyers in Love" By Jackson Browne (1983)
 "Leave in Silence" By Depeche Mode (1982)
 "Leningrad" By Billy Joel (1989)
 "Let Me Die In My Footsteps" By Bob Dylan (1963)
 "Let's All Make A Bomb" By Heaven 17 (1981)
 "Let's Have A War" By Fear (1982)
 "Let's Talk About it" By Dweezil Zappa (1986)
 "Life During Wartime" By Talking Heads (1979)
 "Listen" By Tears For Fears (1985)
 "Live Fast, Die Young" By Circle Jerks (1980)
 "Living Through Another Cuba" By XTC (1980) 
 "Lock and Key" By Rush (1987) 
 "Love Missile F1-11" By Sigue Sigue Sputnik (1986) 
 "Lovers in a Dangerous Time" By Bruce Cockburn (1984) 
 "Man at C&A" By The Specials (1980) 
 "Manhattan Project" By Rush (1985)
 "Maralinga" By Urban Guerrillas (1983)
 "Massive Retaliation" By Sigue Sigue Sputnik (1986)
 "Mediate" By INXS (1987)
 "Merry Minuet" By Kingston Trio (1959)
 "Missiles" By The Sound (1980)
 "Mutually Assured Destruction (M.A.D.)" By Gillan (1986)
 "Nagasaki Nightmare" By Crass (1981)
 "New Frontier" By Donald Fagen (1982)
 "No Nuclear War " By Peter Tosh (1987)
 "North Winds Blowing" By The Stranglers (1985)
 "Nuclear" By Mike Oldfield 
 "Nuclear Attack" By Gary Moore (1981)
 "Nuclear Attack" By Sabaton (2006)
 "Nuclear Cop" By Redgum (1980)
 "Nuclear War" By Sun Ra  Arkestra (1982)
 "Nuclear War" By New Politics (2010)
 "Nuclear War" By Yo La Tengo (2001)
 "Oblivion" By Dirty Rotten Imbeciles (1987)
 "On the Beach" By The Comsat Angels (1980)
 "Oppenheimer" By Leni Oppenheimer (2019)
 "Paranoid Chant" By Minutemen (1980)
 "Party at Ground Zero" By Fishbone (1985)
 "Planet Earth" By Duran Duran (1981)
 "Political Science" By Randy Newman (1972)
 "Pride of Man" by Hamilton Camp (1964)
 "Protect and Survive" By Runrig (1987)
 "Quite Unusual" By Front 242 (1987)
 "Radiation Sickness" By Nuclear Assault (1986)
 "Red Rain" By Peter Gabriel (1986)
 "Red Shadows" By T.S.O.L. (1984)
 "Red Skies" By The Fixx (1982)
 "Red Skies over Paradise By Fischer-Z (1981)
 "Ride the Wind" By Crazy Planet (1988)
 "Ronnie Talk to Russia" by Prince (1981)
 "Russians" By Sting (1985) 
 "Rust in Peace... Polaris" By Megadeth (1990)
 "S.D.I." By Loudness (1987) 
 "Seconds" By U2 (1982)
 "Set the World Afire" By Megadeth (1988)
 "Sign o' the Times" By Prince (1987)
 "So Afraid of the Russians" By Made for TV (1983)
 "So Long, and Thanks for All the Fish" By A Perfect Circle (2018)
 “So Long, Mom (A Song for World War III)” By Tom Lehrer (circa 1965)
 “Soviet Snow” By Shona Laing (1987)
 "The Stage" By Avenged Sevenfold (2016)
 "Stagnation" By Genesis (1970)
 "Stop the World" By The Clash (1980)
 "Strike Zone" By Loverboy (1983)
 "The Sun Is Burning" By Ian Campbell (1963)
 "Strontium 90" By Fred & Betty Dallas with Ron Fielder (1959)
 "Sunrise" By Icehouse (1987)
 "The Apple Tree" by Difford & Tilbrook (1984)
 "The Temptation of Adam" by Josh Ritter (2007)
 "Thank Christ for The Bomb" By Groundhogs (1970)
 "Thank God for The Bomb" By Ozzy Osbourne (1986)
 "The Sun Is Burning" By Simon & Garfunkel (1964)
 "This World Over" by XTC (1984)
 "Time After Time" By Electric Light Orchestra (1983)
 "Time Will Crawl" By David Bowie (1987)
 "Total Eclipse" By Klaus Nomi  (1981)
 "Town to Town" by Microdisney (1987)
 "Tropicana" By Gruppo Italiano (2002)
 "Twilight Gods" By Helloween (1987)
 "Two Minute Warning" By Depeche Mode (1983)
 "Two Suns In the Sunset" By Pink Floyd (1983)
 "Two Tribes" By Frankie Goes to Hollywood (1984)
 "Vamos a la Playa" by Righeira (1983)
 "Vaporized" by X-15 (1981)
 "Walk the Dinosaur" by Was (Not Was) (1987)
 "The Wanderer" By U2 and Johnny Cash (1993)
 "Warhead" By UK Subs (1980)
 "We Don't Want No Nuclear War" By Peter Tosh (1987)
 "We Will All Go Together When We Go" By Tom Lehrer (1959)
 "We Will Become Silhouettes" By The Postal Service (2005)
 "What Have They Done" By Squeeze (1986)
 "When the Wind Blows" By David Bowie (1986)
 "When They Drop the Atomic Bomb" By Jackie Doll and the Pickled Peppers (1951)
 “White Train” by Bananarama (1986)
 "Wind of Change" By Scorpions (1991)
 "Wooden Ships" By Crosby, Stills & Nash (1969)
 "World Destruction" By Time Zone (1984)
 "World Wars III & IV" By Carnivore (band) (1985)
 "137" By Brand New (2017)
 "1999" By Prince (1982) 
 "2 Minutes to Midnight" By Iron Maiden (1984)
 "99 Luftballons" By Nena (1983)

References

Nuclear war
Nuclear warfare
Songs about nuclear war and weapons